Dixon M. Pitcher is an American politician. He was a Republican member of the Utah House of Representatives representing District 10 from January 1, 2011 through 2018. Pitcher was non-consecutively a Representative from January 1, 1985 until December 31, 1986 in the District 8 seat. Dixon lives in Ogden, UT, with his wife, Darlene, and their six children.

Education
Pitcher earned his BA from Weber State College (now Weber State University) and his MA in political science from Utah State University.

Political career
Dixon Pitcher was elected on November 2, 2010. He previously served in the Utah State House of Representatives from 1984 to 1986. During the 2016 Legislative Session, Dixon served on the Business, Economic Development, and Labor Appropriations Subcommittee, the House Business and Labor Committee, and the House Political Subdivisions Committee. 
Mr. Pitcher announced that he will not seek re-election

2016 sponsored bills 

Pitcher passed none of the three bills he introduced. Pitcher also floor sponsored SB0004S01 Business, Economic Development, and Labor Base Budget and SB0133S02 Small Employment Retirement Amendments.

Elections
2014: Pitcher was unopposed in the Republican convention and ran against Democrat Eric Irvine in the General election. Pitcher won with 3,116 votes (57%) to Irvine's 2,355 votes (43%).
2012: Pitcher was unopposed for the June 26, 2012 Republican Primary and won the November 6, 2012 General election with 5,558 votes (54.3%) against Democratic nominee Christopher Winn.
2010: When District 10 incumbent Republican Representative Brent Wallis left the Legislature and left the seat open, Pitcher was unopposed for the May 8, 2010 Republican convention and won the November 2, 2010 General election with 4,229 votes (54.3%) against Democratic nominee Randy Rounds.
1986: Pitcher was unopposed for the 1986 Republican Primary but lost the three-way November 4, 1986 General election to Democratic nominee Haynes Fuller.
1984: To challenge District 8 incumbent Democratic Representative Marvin Heslop, Pitcher won the 1984 Republican Primary with 1,062 votes (53.9%) and won the November 6, 1984 General election with 4,540 votes (52.5%) against Representative Heslop.

References

External links
Official page at the Utah State Legislature
Dixon M. Pitcher at Ballotpedia
Dixon M. Pitcher at the National Institute on Money in State Politics

Place of birth missing (living people)
Year of birth missing (living people)
Living people
Republican Party members of the Utah House of Representatives
Politicians from Ogden, Utah
Utah State University alumni
Weber State University alumni
21st-century American politicians